José Alberto Guadarrama (born 8 May 1972) is a Mexican former professional footballer. He played as a goalkeeper during his career. He was a member of the Mexico national football team competing at the 1992 Summer Olympics in Barcelona, Spain. He was part of Necaxa's squad that finished third in the 2000 FIFA Club World Championship.

References

 
 
 

1972 births
Living people
Association football goalkeepers
Olympic footballers of Mexico
Footballers at the 1992 Summer Olympics
Cruz Azul footballers
Club Necaxa footballers
Club León footballers
Inter Riviera Maya footballers
Liga MX players
Ascenso MX players
Footballers from Mexico City
Mexican footballers